The 1921 Woolwich East by-election was a parliamentary by-election held on 2 March 1921 for the British House of Commons constituency of Woolwich East, in the Metropolitan Borough of Woolwich in London.

Vacancy
The seat had become vacant on the resignation of the constituency's Labour Member of Parliament (MP), Will Crooks, due to ill-health. Crooks was a noted trade unionist and working-class organiser, and had represented Woolwich East and its predecessor seat, Woolwich, since a by-election in 1903, with a gap between the two general elections of 1910.

Candidates 

 The Labour Party selected as its candidate former leader Ramsay MacDonald, who had lost his Leicester seat at the coupon election of 1918.
 The Conservatives selected Robert Gee, an ex-miner who had stood for the National Democratic Party at Consett in 1918. Gee had been a Captain in The Royal Fusiliers during the First World War, and had gained a Victoria Cross for his actions. This was contrasted with MacDonald, who had been a pacifist opposed to the war, for which he had had to resign the Chairmanship of the Labour Party.

Campaign
The newly formed Communist Party of Great Britain urged voters to abstain, saying ""that while the coalition candidate stands openly and avowedly for capitalism in all its ramifications, its industrial autocracy, its attacks on trade unions, its exploitation, its predatory imperialism, the Labour candidate stands for Capitalism and all its manifestations, none the less surely because its purpose is hidden under high sounding words".

Result 
Gee took the seat with a majority of nearly 700 votes.

Aftermath
Gee held the seat until the 1922 election, when Harry Snell retook the seat for Labour.

MacDonald would go on to be elected MP for Aberavon in 1922, and be re-elected Leader of the Labour Party, then become Prime Minister after the 1923 election.

Sources 
Ramsay MacDonald campaigning at Woolwich

See also
 List of United Kingdom by-elections
 Woolwich East constituency
 1903 Woolwich by-election
 1931 Woolwich East by-election
 1951 Woolwich East by-election

References

Bibliography
 
 

Woolwich East by-election
Woolwich
Woolwich East by-election
Woolwich East,1921
Woolwich East,1921
Woolwich East by-election